Maulino forest is a forest type naturally growing in the Chilean Coast Range of Central Chile from latitude 35°55 to 36°20 S. The chief tree species is Nothofagus glauca. Other tree species include Nothofagus leonii, Nothofagus alessandri and Gomortega keule. The forest grows at a transition zone between Mediterranean climate to humid temperate climate. Precipitations vary from 1000 to 700 mm/a and are concentrated in winter. According to geographers Humberto Fuenzalida and Edmundo Pisano the forest is one of mesophytes on the transition zone of temperate rain forests.

José San Martín and Claudio Donoso identify three forest subtypes:
Nothofagus glauca forests
Nothofagus antarctica forests
Nothofagus alessandri forest

Maulino forest stand out for its high degree of endemism.

Fragmentation and degradation
Large swathes of former Maulino forest were cleared for agriculture. This led to significant soil erosion before the areas were planted with Eucalyptus globulus and Pinus radiata. Fragmentation by plantations have had limited or no apparent effect on the native fauna of understory birds (tapaculos) and epigeic beetles. It has been suggested the fragmentation by plantations do not have any major impact if the plantations contain an adequate understory. However, the diversity of small mammals has been reduced by fragmentation.

By unit area the tree species richness is greater in small Maulino forest fragments than in the larger fragment protected in Los Queules National Reserve. While fragmented Maulino forest have been to some degree invaded by exotic species these fragments are still valuable for their native species diversity. In view of this researchers Pablo I. Becerra and Javier A. Simonetti fragmentation is a lesser evil compared with the replacement of Maulino forest.

References

Geography of Biobío Region
Geography of Maule Region
Temperate broadleaf and mixed forests
Flora of the Valdivian temperate rainforest